HNoMS Mjølner was the fourth of five ships of the s built for the Royal Swedish Navy and the Royal Norwegian Navy in the mid-1860s. They were designed under the supervision of the Swedish-born inventor, John Ericsson—coincidentally, designer of Monitor—, and built in Sweden. Mjølner was delivered in 1868 and ran aground the following year, although she was not seriously damaged. The ship was reconstructed in 1897 and given modern breech-loading guns. Mjølner was sold for scrap in 1909.

Design and description
The John Ericsson-class ironclads were designed to meet the need of the Swedish and Norwegian Navies for small, shallow-draft armored ships capable of defending their coastal waters. John Ericsson, designer and builder of Monitor, born in Sweden—although becoming an American citizen in 1848—offered to share his design with the Swedes. In response, they sent Lieutenant John Christian d'Ailly to the United States to study monitor design and construction under Ericsson. D'Ailly arrived in July 1862 and toured rolling mills, gun foundries, and visited several different ironclads under construction. He returned to Sweden in 1863 having completed the drawings of a Monitor-type ship under Ericsson's supervision.

Mjølner was divided into nine main compartments by eight watertight bulkheads. Over time a flying bridge and, later, a full superstructure, was added to each ship between the gun turret and the funnel. Initially her crew numbered 80 officers and men, but this increased to 104 as she was modified with additional weapons.

Propulsion
The John Ericsson-class ships had one twin-cylinder vibrating lever steam engines, designed by Ericsson himself, driving a single four-bladed,  propeller. The ships carried  of coal, enough for six day's steaming.

Armament
Mjølner was armed with a pair of Armstrong  rifled muzzle-loading guns. The ship also carried an  gun. During Mjølners reconstruction in 1897 her gun turret was fixed in place and modified to serve as a barbette for her two new breech-loading Cockerill  guns. She also received two  and  Cockerill guns mounted in her superstructure. In addition two  Hotchkiss 5-barrel revolving guns were mounted in the superstructure. They had a rate of fire of about 30 rounds per minute

Armor
The gun turret's armor consisted of twelve layers of iron, totalling  in thickness on the first four monitors. The inside of the turret was lined with mattresses to catch splinters. The conning tower was positioned on top of the turret and its sides were ten layers thick. The funnel was protected by six layers of armor with a total thickness of  up to half its height.

Service
The Norwegians had built one monitor-type ship of their own, in 1865, and laid down several others, but the Norwegian Parliament authorized construction of Mjølner in 1867 in Sweden at the cost of 1,102,000 Norwegian krone. She was launched in 1868 and completed on 7 September of that year. The ship ran aground at Kragerø on 21 June 1869. Her repairs were completed on 7 July 1869 by the Royal Dockyard at Horten, at the cost of 5,000 krone. The court of inquiry found the ship's commander and the pilot liable for the repairs, but the parliament released the two from their obligation two years later. She was visited by King Charles XV of Sweden on one occasion when visiting one of Sweden's west-coast ports in the early 1870s. Mjølner was laid up after her refit in 1897, but was mobilized during 1905 when the personal union between Sweden and Norway was dissolved. She returned to reserve afterward before being sold for scrap in 1909.

Notes

Footnotes

References

External links
 Naval History via Flix: Skorpionen
 Naval History via Flix: Mjølner

John Ericsson-class monitors of the Royal Norwegian Navy
Skorpionen-class monitors
Ships built in Norrköping
1868 ships